John Herbert Lytton Jack Forrest is a Justice of the Trial Division of the Supreme Court of Victoria. He was appointed in 2007. Both his father (who was Chief Judge James Forrest of the County Court) and brother Terry Forrest (also a current Justice of the Supreme Court) have also served as judges in the State of Victoria. The correct way to refer to him in legal citations is "J Forrest J".

References

Judges of the Supreme Court of Victoria
Living people
Year of birth missing (living people)
Place of birth missing (living people)